"Six-Pack Summer" is a song co-written and recorded by American country music artist Phil Vassar. It was released in June 2001 as the fourth single from his album Phil Vassar.  It peaked at number 9 on the U.S. Billboard Hot Country Singles & Tracks and at number 56 on the U.S. Billboard Hot 100.  The song was written by Vassar, Tommy Rocco and Charlie Black.

Content
The song paints a vivid picture of summer joys such as barbecuing, suntanning and partying.

Critical reception
Deborah Evans Price, of Billboard magazine reviewed the song favorably, calling it "one of those tunes that will want to make you reach for a six-pack of your favorite beverage and just kick back with the sun on your face." She goes on to say that the song boasts a melody "as breezy as a day at the beach."

Music video
The music video was directed by Glen Rose, and features Vassar on his touring. It premiered on CMT on June 26, 2001.

Chart positions
It peaked at number 9 on the Hot Country Songs chart on September 15, 2001 and number 56 on the Billboard Hot 100 chart on September 22, 2001.

Year-end charts

References

[  Allmusic]

2001 singles
2000 songs
Phil Vassar songs
Songs written by Charlie Black
Songs written by Tommy Rocco
Songs written by Phil Vassar
Arista Nashville singles
Song recordings produced by Byron Gallimore